Bixio Music Group, a New York corporation, is the American branch of Gruppo Editoriale Bixio :it:Gruppo Editoriale Bixio, or Bixio Publishing Group, the first Italian music publishing company. The Bixio Publishing Group, currently based in Rome, Italy, was established in Naples during the 1920s by composer Cesare Andrea Bixio. Bixio Music Group, an ASCAP member since 1992, was established to facilitate licensing of the Bixio Publishing Group catalogue that includes not only musical compositions but also sound recordings by related labels under the Group in the territories of North and South America.

The UNEMIA, an organization representing over sixty of the most important and authoritative publishing houses in Italy, states on its website that Gruppo Editoriale Bixio comprises Bixio CEMSA S.r.l., Bixio SAM S.r.l., Edizioni Musicali Nido S.r.l., Gale Italiana S.r.l., Granadine Music S.r.l., Stero Oceania S.r.l., Bixio Cesare Andrea S.r.l., and Grandi Firme Della Canzone S.r.l.

The tradition of Bixio Publishing Group has roots coinciding with the invention of sound film when founder Cesare Andrea Bixio wrote the soundtrack for the first Italian talking movie, 'La Canzone dell' Amore' ("The Song of Love") in 1930. The film achieved popularity, not least for the catchy song ‘Solo per tu Lucia’ (“Only for You, Lucia”), especially composed for the film by Cesare Andrea Bixio. The creation of La Canzone dell' Amore signaled the birth of Bixio Publishing Groups' longstanding collaboration with the cinema. A collaboration that throughout decades of filmmaking has resulted in the pairing of musical works of phenomenal composers, such as  Lalo Schifrin, Ennio Morricone, Pino Donaggio, and Goblin (band), with culturally influential motion pictures of directors such as Liliana Cavani, Dario Argento and Quentin Tarantino.

The progressive electronic rock band Goblin (band) frequently collaborated with writer director Dario Argento. Argento is known primarily as the godfather of giallo and master slasher horror film maker. Goblin created the musical score for a number of Argentos’ films including Profondo Rosso, Suspiria (soundtrack), Tenebrae (film) and most recently in 2000 ‘Non ho Sonno’ or Sleepless. The original soundtracks to these films were all released by the Bixio Publishing Group label Cinevox.  The 1977 Argento film Suspiria is currently being remade and is scheduled to be released in 2017.

The score 7 Notes in Black, performed by Vince Tempera & Orchestra, is from the original soundtrack released in 1977 for the film ‘Sette Note In Nero’ a.k.a. ‘The Psychic’ starring Jennifer O’Neil and directed by Lucio Fulci. The original score was composed by Franco Bixio, Vincenzo Tempera and Fabio Frizzi. The main theme song from the film ‘7 Note’ was also used in the film ‘Kill Bill 1’ directed by Quentin Tarantino.

Evan Lurie worked with Bixios’ Cinevox Records on the original score for the film The Little Devil directed by Roberto Benigni and starring the director himself together with legendary comic Walter Matthau. The song 'Devils Tango' from this original soundtrack was most recently used in the film Silver Linings Playbook.

The 1970 film Investigation of a Citizen Above Suspicion Investigation of a Citizen Above Suspicion was directed by Elio Petri
and was considered one of the best foreign films in the 1970s. The musical score was composed by Ennio Morricone in also in collaboration with Bixios’ Cinevox Records. Bixio Music Group licensed the theme from this film for use in the TV series Chuck. The following link contains a full list of compositions by Ennio Morricone.

Notably, Bixio Music Group also licensed use of the song Mamma (song) composed in 1940 by Cesare Andrea Bixio and Bixio Cherubini (that has been performed under license by the Three Tenors among others) for synchronization in the television series The Sopranos.

Bixio Publishing Group owns a host of record labels, including Cinevox Records and Bubble Records. Cinevox Records was created by Cesare Andrea Bixio in the early 1960s, to specialize in the release of film scores. Cinevox released its first soundtrack in 1966, for the film The Poppy Is Also a Flower, by  film composer Georges Auric.  Throughout the years Cinevox has been responsible for creating and releasing all 600 of Bixio Publishing Groups' original soundtrack albums which span across genres including spaghetti westerns, horror, comedy and romance. Bubble Records was founded in 1980 and managed by :it:Franco Bixio and :it:Carlo Andrea Bixio, sons of Cesare Andrea Bixio. Bubble Records expanded the reach of the Publishing Group into the sphere of international pop music, producing artists such as Keith Emerson and Donovan. The Bubble Records phonographs were published by Edizioni Italiana Gale also owned by the Bixio Publishing Group. Bubbles' own roster of artists included Giuni Russo, Eugenio Bennato, I Camaleonti and Tony Esposito to name a few. Musikstrasse is another label controlled by Bixio Publishing Group, it is active in the genre of classical music.

References

External links
Cinecorriere 2016 Special Edition dedicated to Ennio Morricone

Music publishing companies of Italy
Publishing companies established in the 1920s